Julian Edmund Tenison-Woods (15 November 18327 October 1889), commonly referred to as Father Woods, was an English Catholic priest and geologist who served in Australia. With Mary MacKillop, he co-founded the Sisters of St Joseph of the Sacred Heart at Penola in 1866.

Early life
Tenison-Woods was born in London, the sixth son (of eleven children) of James Dominick Woods, a sub-editor of The Times, and his wife, Henrietta Maria Saint-Eloy Tenison, daughter of the Rev. Joseph Tenison, rector of Donoughmore, County Wicklow and of the same family as Archbishop Thomas Tenison. She became a Catholic.

Julian Tenison-Woods was baptised by the Rev. John White of the Belgian Chapel, Southwark, and confirmed by Cardinal Wiseman, at that time Vicar-Apostolic of the London District. He attended Thomas Hunt's Catholic school, Kent House, Hammersmith, and, briefly, Newington Grammar School.

During his youth there was probably a period when he fell away from his church. His own manuscript memoirs, written during his last illness, represent him as leading the life of an Anglican when 16 years old, and being converted to Catholicism soon afterwards. Tenison-Woods' biographer, the Rev. George O'Neill SJ, discusses the question at some length and gives reasons for thinking that Tenison-Woods's memory at the time of writing the memoir may be untrustworthy.

Early career
In 1846, Tenison-Woods obtained a position in The Times office, but after a few weeks went to live at Jersey with his mother whose health had failed. He returned to London in less than two years and resumed his position at The Times office. In 1849 he assisted Canon Oakley, a convert who had charge of the Catholic chapel at Islington, with a school he had established.
In 1850 he entered the monastery of the Passionist order at Broadway in Worcestershire and became a novice. His health began to fail and he studied at Marist seminaries near Toulon, France, where he also taught English at a naval college. Around this time his interest in geology and natural history appears to have begun.

In 1854, in England, Tenison-Woods met Robert Willson, the first Roman Catholic Bishop of Hobart. The two travelled to Van Diemen's Land (now Tasmania), arriving in Hobart on the Bernicia on 30 January 1855. Woods fell into disagreement with Willson  and left for Adelaide around March/April 1855. He worked for the Adelaide Times as sub-editor for a year, then in April 1856 entered the "Sevenhill" Jesuit college near Clare, South Australia to prepare for ordination. His brother J. D. Woods helped by completing his contract with the newspaper.

Priesthood
Tenison-Woods was ordained as a diocesan priest on 4 January 1857 and took charge of the large parish at Penola. He published his first book, Geological Observations in South Australia, in 1862. With Sister Mary MacKillop (who was later canonised), Tenison-Woods co-founded the Congregation of Sisters of St Joseph of the Sacred Heart] at Penola in 1866. He made regular long journeys over his large parish and systematically visited every place where he would find a member of his church. The climate improved his health, he was free from anxieties and passed through 10 happy years.
Tenison-Woods joined an exploring party that was starting for the interior and began a methodical study of geology and mineralogy. After four years as director of Catholic education, he continued working as a scientist and missionary priest in New South Wales, Tasmania and Queensland.

Tenison-Woods met Adam Lindsay Gordon, of whom he afterwards wrote an account which appeared in the Melbourne Review of April 1884. Early in 1867, Tenison-Woods was transferred to Adelaide and was appointed director-general of Catholic education and secretary to Bishop Laurence Sheil, with the clerical style of The Very Reverend. Another of his duties was the administration of the newly erected cathedral.

Tenison-Woods founded a small monthly magazine called the Southern Cross in 1867. It ceased after two years, but he made a further foray into journalism in 1870 with of The Chaplet and Advocate of the Children of Mary, which may have run to no more than two issues. He was then involved, initially with Archdeacon Russell and Father Byrne, in production of the monthly Southern Cross and Catholic Herald, which was dropped after the weekly Irish Harp and Farmers' Herald had become firmly established and the two amalgamated around November 1873 as The Harp and Southern Cross.

He has been described as a "rigid teetotaller" and a "stern advocate" of temperance for many years.

Tenison-Woods was working long hours and under many anxieties, his health again broke down. In 1872 there was an episcopal investigation into the general conditions of the Diocese of Adelaide. The result was that Tenison-Woods was deposed from his various positions and he left Adelaide. He began working in the Bathurst diocese and in 1873 went to Brisbane and worked as a missionary for almost a year. In January 1874 he left for Tasmania, stopping for a few days in Melbourne where, on 13 February, he gave a scientific lecture. In Tasmania he had great success as a missioner.

Geological work
Tenison-Woods' district contained many formations of geological interest. He kept in touch with other scientists and built up a library of scientific books. Tenison-Woods published his first book, Geological Observations in South Australia, in 1862. His History of the Discovery and Exploration of Australia (London, 1865) in two volumes, and his serialized "Australian bibliography" in the Australian Monthly Magazine (1866–67), show Tenison-Woods' broad knowledge. On his occasional visits to cities he sometimes gave scientific lectures. Wherever he went he was interested in the geology and natural history of the district.

In 1878, Tenison-Woods joined the Linnean Society of New South Wales, he had taken up his scientific work again after leaving Adelaide. He was elected president of the society in 1880 and took much interest in its activities. He had been for many years a fellow of the Geological Society. London. His Fish and Fisheries of New South Wales (Sydney, 1883) was published by the colonial government and William III of the Netherlands awarded Tenison-Woods a gold medal for the book.

Evolution
Tenison-Woods was an advocate of theistic evolution. In 1880, he commented "I can well believe that there is much truth in evolution. If tomorrow the evidence of its occurrence were established on indubitable grounds, it would be one more beautiful illustration of the plan of nature."

Exploration
In 1883, Tenison-Woods was invited by his friend and governor of Singapore, Sir Frederick Weld, to undertake a scientific tour in the Straits Settlements. Tenison-Woods also travelled extensively in Java, the adjacent islands and the Philippines, and provided the British government with a valuable confidential report on the coal resources of the East. He also travelled to China and Japan, returning to Sydney in 1886. Shortly afterwards he was away for four months on an exploration in the Northern Territory.

Weakening health and death
On Tenison-Woods' return in May 1887 he found his eyesight and general health were weakened. He found a home in Sydney in one of the charitable communities he had founded, but was told by Cardinal Francis Moran that if he wished to remain in the diocese and exercise his priestly faculties, he was to take up his residence in a place appointed for him. Tenison-Woods disregarded his instructions. He had received and given away a large amount paid to him for his scientific work for the government and was now poor and feeble. He did not lack friends, however, and was well-cared for. He dictated his partly fanciful autobiographical memoir to his carers. One of his last works was a paper on the "Natural History of the Mollusca of Australia" for which he was awarded the 1888 Clarke Medal for distinguished contribution to natural science and a grant of £25 by the Royal Society of New South Wales. Early in 1889, his health began to grow steadily worse and after much patient suffering he died at St Vincent's Hospital on 7 October 1889, aged 56, and was buried in the Catholic section at Waverley Cemetery, Sydney.

Publications
A History of the Discovery and Exploration of Australia. Or, an Account of the Progress of Geographical Discovery in that Continent from the earliest period to the present day. By the Rev. J. E. T. Woods, F. R. G. S. &c., &c., &c. (1865)

Family
Three brothers of Woods emigrated to Australia:
Edward Tenison Woods (c. 1825 – 4 June 1866) was a reporter for the Melbourne Argus.
James Dominick Woods (1826 – 7 July 1905), South Australian journalist and author of The Province of South Australia. He emigrated in 1853 as an agent of banker John Abel Smith (1802–1871). His contribution to South Australian letters was acknowledged by "A. Pencil" (Sir William Sowden).  A grandson, (Julian) Gordon Tenison Woods (1909– ) married Mary Cecil Kitson (1893–1971) on 13 December 1924. She was South Australia's first woman barrister. He was struck of the rolls in 1927 for misuse of trust funds; they divorced in 1933.
Terence Albert Tenison-Woods (c. 1835 – 1 July 1887) was postmaster at Penola, died in Sydney.

Commemoration
In 1974 the highest peak in the D'Aguilar Range (770 m) within Brisbane Forest Park, south-east Queensland, was named Tenison-Woods Mountain.

Botanical Collecting
The preserved plants collected by Tenison-Woods are cared for by multiple herbaria throughout Australasia, including over 1,000 specimens held by the National Herbarium of Victoria, Royal Botanic Gardens Victoria, the Queensland Herbarium, the National Herbarium of New South Wales, the Northern Territory Herbarium, and the Auckland War Memorial Museum Herbarium.

See also
List of Roman Catholic scientist-clerics

Notes

References

References
 Tenison-Woods, J.E. 1882. The Hawkesbury Sandstone. Journal and Proceedings of the Royal Society of New South Wales 16:53–116.
 Tenison-Woods, J.E. 1883. Physical structure and geology of Australia. The Proceedings of the Linnean Society of New South Wales 7:371–389.

External links

Digitized works by J. E. Tenison-Woods at Biodiversity Heritage Library

1832 births
1889 deaths
19th-century English Roman Catholic priests
Australian Roman Catholic priests
19th-century Australian geologists
Burials at Waverley Cemetery
English people of Irish descent
Members of the Linnean Society of New South Wales
Passionists
Catholic clergy scientists
Theistic evolutionists
Australian temperance activists